Open Forum may refer to:

 Forum (legal), a United States constitutional law term
 Open Forum (Australia), Australian E-Democracy site